Claudia Amengual Puceiro (born 7 January 1969, in Montevideo) is a Uruguayan writer and translator. She is a recipient of the Sor Juana Inés de la Cruz Prize.

Biography
She obtained her degrees in translation and literature at the University of the Republic. In 2003 she obtained a fellowship to study at the Complutense University of Madrid and Menéndez Pelayo International University in Santander, Spain. Member of Bogotá39.

Work
Juliana y los libros, 2020 (novel)
El lugar inalcanzable, 2018 (novel)
Viajar y escribir: nueve destinos que inspiran, 2017 (essay)
Una mirada al periodismo cultural: Jaime Clara y "Sábado Sarandí", 2016 (essay)
Cartagena, 2015 (novel)
Rara avis. Vida y obra de Susana Soca, 2012 (essay)
Falsas ventanas, 2011 (novel)
Más que una sombra, 2007 (novel)  
Desde las cenizas, 2005 (novel)
El vendedor de escobas, 2002 (novel)
La rosa de Jericó, 2000 (novel)

Prizes
Premio Sor Juana Inés de la Cruz (2006) for Desde las cenizas.
Mention in Dramaturgy, Premios Onetti (2018) for Camaleón, camaleón.

References

1969 births
Writers from Montevideo
University of the Republic (Uruguay) alumni
Uruguayan translators
Uruguayan women novelists
Uruguayan novelists
Living people
21st-century translators
20th-century Uruguayan women writers
20th-century Uruguayan writers
21st-century Uruguayan women writers
21st-century Uruguayan writers